Sanskrit words and phrases